is a Japanese manga series written and illustrated by Yu Hashimoto. It began serialization on Shueisha's Shōnen Jump+ website in June 2019. As of January 2023, the series' individual chapters have been collected into sixteen tankōbon volumes. An anime television series adaptation has been announced.

Plot 
Okumura is a second-year high school student who serves as the president and only member of his school's manga club. An otaku, he claims he has no interest in real girls due to his obsession with a fictional character named Liliel. Suddenly, a first-year student named Lilysa Amano, who is passionate about cosplay, joins the club. When he agrees to be her photographer, Okumura discovers her favorite character is also Liliel. As a result, he finds himself conflicted about the situation.

Media

Manga 
Written and illustrated by Yu Hashimoto, the series began serialization on Shueisha's Shōnen Jump+ manga website on June 15, 2019. As of January 2023, the series' individual chapters have been collected into sixteen tankōbon volumes.

In June 2021, Seven Seas Entertainment announced that they licensed the series for English publication under their Ghost Ship imprint.

Volume list

Anime 
An anime television series adaptation was announced on December 10, 2022.

Reception 
Itachi Utada from Famitsu praised the story and characters of the series, particularly enjoying the cosplay elements present.

In the 2020 Next Manga Award, the series ranked fourth in the web manga category. The series has one million copies in circulation between its digital and print releases.

References

External links 
  
  
 

Anime series based on manga
Cosplay
Japanese webcomics
Otaku in fiction
Romantic comedy anime and manga
School life in anime and manga
Seven Seas Entertainment titles
Shōnen manga
Shueisha manga
Upcoming anime television series
Webcomics in print